The 2010 Cork Junior A Football Championship was the 112th staging of the Cork Junior A Football Championship since its establishment by the Cork County Board. The draw for the opening fixtures took place on 13 December 2009. The championship ran from 26 September to 31 October 2010.

The final was played on 31 October 2010 at Páirc Uí Rinn in Cork, between Cloyne and White's Cross, in what was their first ever meeting in the final. Clyne won the match by 0-10 to 0-09 to claim their first ever championship title.

White's Cross's Ken O'Keeffe was the championship's top scorer with 0-15.

Qualification

Results

Quarter-finals

Semi-finals

Final

Championship statistics

Top scorers

Top scorers overall

Top scorers in a single game

References

2010 in Irish sport
Cork Junior Football Championship